Jean Bodel (c. 1165 – c. 1210), was an Old French poet who wrote a number of chansons de geste as well as many fabliaux. He lived in Arras.

Writings
Bodel wrote  ("Song of the Saxons") about the war of King Charlemagne with the Saxons and their leader Widukind, whom Bodel calls Guiteclin.  He also wrote a miracle play called the Le Jeu de saint Nicolas ("The Game of Saint Nicolas"), which was probably first performed in Arras on 5 December 1200. Set in the middle of an epic battle between Christians and Muslims, the play tells the story of a good Christian who escapes the battle and is found praying to a statue of Saint Nicolas by the Muslim forces. The Muslim leader decides to test the saint by unlocking the doors to his treasury and leaving the statue as a guardian, stipulating that if anything were stolen the Christian would forfeit his life. Three thieves attempt to steal the treasure, but Saint Nicolas stops them. As a result, the Muslim ruler and his entire army convert to Christianity.

Like another French miracle play from the same time period, Le Miracle de Théophile, Le Jeu de saint Nicolas contains an invocation to the Devil in an unknown language:

Palas aron ozinomas
Baske bano tudan donas
Geheamel cla orlay
Berec hé pantaras tay

Bodel was the first person of record to classify the legendary themes and literary cycles known to medieval literature into the "Three Matters":

the "Matter of Rome", or retellings of stories from classical antiquity
the "Matter of Britain", concerning King Arthur and related topics
the "Matter of France", concerning Charlemagne and his paladins

Bodel contracted leprosy in 1202 or 1205, and entered a leprosarium. He then wrote a long farewell, "Les Congés", his most personal and touching work.

References

External links
 
 

1160s births
1210 deaths
People from Arras
12th-century French poets
French male poets